Eric Munshaw (February 10, 1954 – March 15, 2018) was a Canadian slalom canoer who competed in the early 1970s. He finished 34th in the K-1 event at the 1972 Summer Olympics in Munich.

References
Eric Munshaw's profile at Sports Reference.com
Eric Munshaw's obituary

1954 births
2018 deaths
Canadian male canoeists
Canoeists at the 1972 Summer Olympics
Olympic canoeists of Canada